Mori is a Japanese and Italian surname, and also a Persian pet name for Morteza. It is also the name of two clans in Japan, and one clan in India.

Italian surname
Camilo Mori, Chilean painter
Cesare Mori, Italian "Iron Prefect"
Claudia Mori, Italian actress, singer, television producer
Damian Mori, Italian-Australian football player
Daniele Mori (born 1990) Italian footballer
Fabrizio Mori, Italian hurdler
Federico Mori, Italian rugby union player
Francesco Mori, Italian painter
Lara Mori, Italian artistic gymnast
Manuele Mori, Italian professional road bicycle racer 
Massimiliano Mori, Italian former professional road bicycle racer
Michael Mori, aka "Dan Mori", U.S. military lawyer
Miguel Mori, Argentine footballer
Nicolas Mori, Italian-English violinist
Paola Mori, Italian actress and aristocrat
Primo Mori, Italian professional road bicycle racer.
Ramiro Funes Mori and Rogelio Funes Mori, twin brothers and Argentine footballers
Scott Alan Mori (1941–2020), American botanist
Simone Mori (cyclist), Italian former professional racing cyclist
Uberto Mori, Italian religious figure

Japanese surname
Mori (written:  lit. "forest") is the 24th most common Japanese surname. Mōri (written:) is a separate surname that may be transliterated the same way.

Akihiko Mori (森 彰彦, 1966–1998), composer
Akio Mori (森 昭雄, born 1947), physiologist and writer
Akira Mori (森 章, born 1936), son of Taikichiro Mori, CEO of Mori Trust
Mori Arinori (森 有礼, 1847–1889), statesman/diplomat
Bárbara Mori (b. 1978), Uruguayan-born Mexican actress, model, producer and writer 
Mori Chack (森 チャック, born 1973), graphics designer
Mori Calliope (森 カリオペ), livestreamer, rapper, and singer
Chiharu Mori (森 千春, born 1962), swimmer
Chinatsu Mori (森 千夏, 1980–2006), shotputter
Daisuke Mori (守 大助, born 1971), nurse and serial killer
Eijiro Mori (森 英次郎, born 1986), footballer
Eisuke Mori (森 英介, born 1948), politician
Futoshi Mori (森 太志, born 1988), rugby player
Hanae Mori (森 英恵, 1926–2022), fashion designer
Hideki Mori (森 秀樹, born 1961), manga artist
Hiroshi Mori (astronomer) (森 弘, born 1958), astronomer
Hiroshi Mori (writer) (森 博嗣, born 1957), writer and engineer
Ikue Mori (森 郁恵, born 1953), musician
Johnny Mori (b. 1949), Japanese-American musician and arts educator/administrator
Junko Mori (森 純子, born 1974), metalwork sculptor
Kanna Mori (森 カンナ, born 1988), actress
Kaori Mori (森 かおり, born 1979), badminton player
Kaoru Mori (森 薫, born 1978), manga artist
Katsuhiro Mori (森 勝洋, born 1983), champion 'Magic: The Gathering' player
Katsuji Mori (森 功至, born 1945), voice actor
Kazutoshi Mori (森 和俊, born 1958), molecular biologist
Kenzo Mori (森 研三, 1914–2007), Japanese-Canadian journalist
Kyoichi Mori (森 恭一), Japanese whale-watcher
Mori Koben (森 小弁, 1869–1945), adventurer and businessman
Mōri Koyuki (毛利 小雪, born 2002) better known as Yuki (Korean : 유키), member & rapper of South Korean idol girl group Purple Kiss under Rainbow Bridge World
Larry Mori (b. 1948), American bridge player
Manny Mori (born 1949), former President of the Federated States of Micronesia (great grandson of Mori Koben)
Mori Mari, novelist (Ōgai's daughter)
Maria Mori, Japanese-American actress
Mariko Mori, artist
Masaaki Mori (baseball)
Masahiro Mori (designer)
Masahiro Mori (roboticist)
Masako Mori (singer)
Masako Mori (politician)
Masayuki Mori (actor)
, Japanese javelin thrower
Minoru Mori (1934-2012), son of Taikichiro Mori, building tycoon and namesake for Roppongi Hills Mori Tower
Mitsugu Mori, fighter ace
Mitsuko Mori, actress
Mōri Motonari, daimyō of the Mōri clan
Mōri Hidemoto, retainer of the Toyotomi clan throughout the latter Sengoku Period 
Mucha Mori, basketball player
Mori Naganao, daimyō
Nana Mori, actress 
Naoki Mori (disambiguation), several people
Naoko Mori, actress
Nobuteru Mori, businessman
Mōri Terumoto, daimyō
Mori Ōgai, novelist and physician
Mori Ranmaru, samurai during the Sengoku period
Reiko Mori, Japanese novelist
Riyo Mori, Miss Universe 2007
S. Floyd Mori, American educator and politician
, Japanese table tennis player
, Japanese basketball player
Satoshi Mori (skier) (born 1971), Japanese Nordic combined skier
Shigefumi Mori, mathematician
Shigeaki Mori, historian
Shigeki Mori,  mayor of Neagari
Shigekazu Mori, baseball player
Shinichi Mori, enka singer
Shinji Mori, baseball player
, Japanese footballer
Mori Sōiken, co-leader of the 17th-century Shimabara Rebellion
Mori Sosen, Japanese painter
, Japanese poet
Taikichiro Mori (1904-1993), founder of Mori Building Company
Mōri Takachika, daimyō
Takaji Mori, football player
Takayuki Mori, wrestler
Takeshi Mori (commander) (1894–1945), commander of the Japanese Empire's First Imperial Guards Division, at the end of World War II
Takeshi Mori (director) (b. 1963), anime director, storyboard artist, and script writer
Takeshi Mori (announcer) (b. 1959), announcer on Yomiuri TV in Japan
Tamezo Mori, naturalist
Tatsuya Mori, film director
, Japanese baseball player
Toshia Mori, actress
Toshio Mori, American author
Toshiko Mori, architect
Tsuneo Mori, radical leftist
Ushinosuke Mori, anthropologist
Wataru Mori, actor
Yoshirō Mori, former Prime Minister of Japan
Yoshiro Mori (mathematician)
Yoshitoshi Mori, artist
Yukinojo Mori, singer
Yuito Mori, baseball player
Yusuke Mori, footballer
Yuko Mori, politician
Yuto Mori, footballer
Mori Yoshinari, 16th-century samurai
Mori Nagayoshi, son of Mori Yoshinari
Mori Ranmaru, son of Mori Yoshinari
Yasuji Mori, animator
Yoko Mori, novelist

Aramaic title of honor
Mori, a word used extensively by Yemenite Jews designating a "rabbi", taken from the Judeo-Aramaic word,  (mor), meaning "master" or "lord". Mori, literally meaning, "my master," or "my lord".

Other people named Mori
Amirkhan Mori, Russian businessman
Dan Mori (born 1988 as Dean (Din) Mori), Israeli footballer
Raam Mori, Gujarati author
Lucija Mori, Slovenian footballer
Chitrangada Mori, Indian aristocrat
Mark de Mori, Australian boxer
Mori Eskandani, American poker player
Mori Arkin, Israeli businessman

Fictional characters
Ai Mori in The Law of Ueki
Mori Green, a minor character in Grand Theft Auto IV
Mori Kibbutz, the brother of Brucie in Grand Theft Auto IV
Kogoro Mouri, character in Detective Conan
Mako Mori, character in the  film Pacific Rim
Ran Mouri, character in Detective Conan
Shin Mōri, character in Yoroiden Samurai Troopers
Takashi "Mori" Morinozuka, character in Ouran High School Host Club
Yorick Mori, character in the online multiplayer game League of Legends
Mario Mori, character in Doubutsu Sentai Zyuohger
Mori Jin, the main character of The God of Highschool

See also
mori (interjection)
Mohri, a Japanese surname
Moori (disambiguation)
Māori, the indigenous people of New Zealand

References

Italian-language surnames
Japanese-language surnames